Salaam Venky is a 2022 Indian Hindi-language slice of life drama film directed by Revathi. The film is produced by Suraj Singh and Shraddha Agrawal through their banners, Blive Productions and RTake Studios, respectively. Starring Kajol and Vishal Jethwa in the lead roles, the film is centered around a true story of a mother who does everything she can to let her son, diagnosed with Duchenne muscular dystrophy, live life to the fullest.

The film was announced on 7 October 2021 by Revathi and Kajol. Principal photography began on 11 February 2022, the first schedule took place in Mumbai. The film was theatrically released on 9 December 2022.

Cast 
 Kajol as Kolavennu Sujata Krishnan
 Vishal Jethwa as Kolavennu Venkatesh "Venky" Prasad Krishnan
 Aahana Kumra as Sanjana, TV Journalist
 Rahul Bose as Lawyer Parvez Alam 
 Rajeev Khandelwal as Dr. Shekhar Tripathi
 Prakash Raj as Judge Anupam Bhatnagar
 Anant Mahadevan as Guruji
 Priyamani as Nanda Kumar, the Public Prosecutor 
 Kamal Sadanah as Karunesh Prasad, Venky's father
 Maala Parvathi as Nurse
 Ridhi Kumar as Sharda Prasad Krishnan, Venky's sister
 Aneet Padda as Nandini (Debut role)
 Revathi as Radha Bhatnagar, Judge's wife
 Aamir Khan as an illusion of Sujata
 Jaineeraj Rajpurohit as Mohan

Sources 

The film is based on the book The Last Hurrah by Shrikanth Murthy which is based on the real life events of Kolavennu Venkatesh and his mother K. Sujata.

Production 

The film was announced in October 2021, tentatively titled The Last Hurrah. The announcement consisted of a picture of the lead and the director. Later however, the name was changed to Salaam Venky when the shooting commenced.

The main parts of the film were shot from February–April 2022 in India, the remaining parts were shot later on in the year including Aamir Khan's cameo. Filming wrapped up on 3 October 2022.

Soundtrack 

The music of the film is composed by Mithoon. Lyrics are penned by Mithoon, Sandeep Shrivastava and Kausar Munir.

Release

Theatrical
Salaam Venky was released on 9 December 2022 in cinemas.

Home media
The digital and satellite rights are held by Zee5 and Zee Cinema, respectively. The film was premiered on ZEE5 from February 10, 2023.

Reception 
Dhaval Roy of The Times of India rated the film 4 out of 5 stars and wrote "The heart-touching fare, replete with positivity as much as pain, is a must-watch".

References

External links 
 
Salaam Venky on ZEE5
 Salaam Venky at Rotten Tomatoes
 

Films about women in India
Indian films based on actual events
Hindi-language films based on actual events
2020s Hindi-language films
Films directed by Revathi
Indian biographical drama films
2022 films
2022 drama films
Films scored by Mithoon
Films based on books
Films about disability in India
Sony Pictures films
Columbia Pictures films
Sony Pictures Networks India films